Calisthenics (American English) or callisthenics (British English) (/ˌkælɪsˈθɛnɪks/) is a form of strength training consisting of a variety of movements that exercise large muscle groups (gross motor movements), such as standing, grasping, pushing, etc. These exercises are often performed rhythmically and with minimal equipment, as bodyweight exercises. They are intended to increase strength, fitness, and flexibility, through movements such as pulling, pushing, bending, jumping, or swinging, using one's body weight for resistance in pull-ups, push-ups, squats, etc. Calisthenics can provide the benefits of muscular and aerobic conditioning, in addition to improving psychomotor skills such as balance, agility, and coordination.

Urban calisthenics is a form of street workout; calisthenics groups perform exercise routines in urban areas. Individuals and groups train to perform advanced calisthenics skills such as muscle-ups, levers, and various freestyle moves such as spins and flips.

Sports teams and military units often perform leader-directed group calisthenics as a form of synchronized physical training (often including a customized "call and response" routine) to increase group cohesion and discipline. Calisthenics is also popular as a component of physical education in primary and secondary schools over much of the globe.

In addition to general fitness, calisthenics exercises are often used as baseline physical evaluations for military organizations around the world. For example, they are used in the U.S. Army Physical Fitness Test and the U.S.M.C. Physical Fitness Test.

Origin and etymology 
The Oxford English Dictionary describes callisthenics as "gymnastic exercises to achieve fitness and grace of movement". It is the art of using one's body weight as resistance in order to develop physique.

The practice was recorded in use in Ancient Greece, including the armies of Alexander the Great and the Spartans at the Battle of Thermopylae.

Calisthenics was also recorded to have been in use in Ancient China. Along with dieting, Han Dynasty physicians prescribed calisthenics as one of the methods of maintaining one's health.

Common exercises 

The more commonly performed calisthenic exercises include:

Most common

 Push-ups
 Performed face down on the floor, palms against the floor under the shoulders, toes curled upwards against the floor. The arms are used to lift the body while maintaining a straight line from head to heel. The arms go from fully extended in the high position to nearly fully flexed in the low position while avoiding resting on the floor. This exercise trains Chest, shoulders, and triceps. An easier version of this exercise consists of placing the hands on a wall and then bending and straightening the arms.
 Sit-ups
 A person lies on their back with their legs bent. They bend at the waist and move their head and torso towards their legs. They then lower themselves back down to the start position. For people who find it difficult to get down onto the ground, a similar range of motion can be achieved by standing with the legs slightly bent, and then bowing slightly and straightening up again.
 Squats
 Standing with feet shoulder-width apart, the subject squats down until their thighs are parallel with the floor; during this action, they move their arms forwards in front of them. They then return to a standing position whilst moving their arms back to their sides. Squats train the quadriceps, hamstrings, calves, gluteal muscles, and core. The height of the squat can be adjusted to be deeper or shallower depending on the fitness level of the individual i.e. if someone struggles with exercise they can do half or quarter squats. They are among the most versatile calisthenic exercises because they can be performed easily in most environments and with a limited amount of space.

Common

 Burpees
 A full body calisthenics workout that works abdominal muscles, chest, arms, legs, and some parts of the back.
 Chin-ups and pull-ups
 Chin-ups and pull-ups are similar exercises but use opposite facing grips.
 For a chin-up, the palms of the hands are facing the person as they pull up their body using the chin-up bar. The chin-up focuses on the biceps muscles, rather than the latissimus dorsi muscle which is the focus of the pull-up.
 For a pull-up, the bar is grasped using a shoulder-width grip. The subject lifts their body up, chin level with the bar, and keeping the back straight throughout. The bar remains in front of the subject at all times. The subject then slowly returns to starting position in a slow controlled manner. This primarily trains the lats or upper back muscles, as well as the forearms.
 Dips
 Done between parallel bars or facing either direction of trapezoid bars found in some gyms. Feet are crossed with either foot in front and the body is lowered until the elbows are in line with the shoulders. The subject then pushes up until the arms are fully extended, but without locking the elbows. Dips focus primarily on the chest, triceps, and deltoids, especially the anterior portion.
 Front lever and back lever
 A front lever is performed by performing a lat pulldown of the bar with straight arms until the body is parallel to the ground, with the front of the body facing upwards. May be done on rings or pull-up bar.
 A back lever is performed by lowering from an inverted hang from rings or bar, until the gymnast's body is parallel to the ground and facing towards the floor.
 Handstand

 A handstand is the act of supporting the body in a stable, inverted vertical position by balancing on the hands. In a basic handstand, the body is held straight with arms and legs fully extended, with hands spaced approximately shoulder-width apart.
 Hyperextensions
 Performed in a prone position on the ground, the individual raises the legs, arms and upper body off the ground.
 Leg raises
 Lying on the back, hands in fists under buttocks, move feet up and down.
 L-sit
 The L-sit is an acrobatic body position in which all body weight rests on the hands, with the torso held in a slightly forward-leaning orientation, with legs held horizontally so that each leg forms a nominal right-angle with the torso. The right-angle causes the body to have a notable "L" shape, hence the name "L-sit". The L sit requires you to keep your core tensed and hold your legs horizontal so your body sits in a perfect 'L' position. This requires significant abdominal strength and a high level of hamstring flexibility.
 Muscle-ups
 An intermediate calisthenics exercise. Performed by a combination routine of a pull-up followed by a dip. May be done on pullup bars or rings.
 Planche
 One of the most advanced exercises, which may be achieved after years of training. The planche requires a high amount of strength (particularly for taller individuals) as well as balance.
 Planks

 This is the name for holding the 'top' position of a push-up for extended periods of time, it can be also applied on elbows. The primary muscle involved in this exercise is the rectus abdominis, especially if a posterior pelvic tilt is maintained.
 Shuttle runs
 This is running back and forth between two points (or cones) typically separated by 5–40 meters, as fast as possible, with a touchdown. The emphasis should be on stopping, turning back and accelerate back to a sprint as quickly as possible.
 Squat jumps
 A variant of the squat. Performed by entering a squatting position, then using a plyometric jumping movement to jump as high as possible.

 Pistol Squat

Another variant of the squat where the movement is performed with 1 leg and the other pointed in front of the body. This exercise requires balance, coordination, and strength to push your body weight back up. 

 Diamond Pushups

Where the hands are placed close together on the ground with the fingers touching at a slight angle. This works the triceps and inner chest muscles while requiring more strength than the normal pushup. 

 Archer Pushups

A harder variation of the pushup and a stepping stone to the one arm pushup. The archer pushups are performed with arms spread wide on the ground and when you do the pushup lean to the left or the right so the opposite arm is straight out and the side you lean to is bent. 
 Calf raises and/or small hops without weight.

 Lunges

Co-operative calisthenics 

Co-operative calisthenics refers to calisthenic exercises that involve two or more participants helping each other to perform the exercise. Such exercises may also be known as partner exercises, partner resisted exercises, partner carrying, or bodyweight exercises with a partner. They have been used for centuries as a way of building physical strength, endurance, mobility, and co-ordination. Usually, one person performs the exercise and the other person adds resistance. For example, a person performing squats with someone on their back, or someone holding another person in their arms and walking around. Some exercises also involve the use of equipment. Two people may hold onto different ends of a rope and pull in different directions. One person would deliberately provide a lesser amount of resistance, which adds resistance to the exercise whilst also allowing the other person to move through a full range of motion as their superior level of force application pulls the rope along. A disadvantage such exercises have is that it can be hard to measure how much resistance is being added by the partner when considered in comparison to free weights or machines. An advantage they have is that they allow for relatively high levels of resistance to be added with equipment being optional. On this basis, co-operative calisthenics can be just as easily performed on a playing field as in a gym. They are also versatile enough to allow them to be used for training goals other than simply strength. For example, a squat with a partner can be turned into a power-focused exercise by jumping or hopping with the partner instead, or even lifting them up on one knee.

Benefits 
A 2017 study: "The effects of a calisthenics training intervention on posture, strength and body composition" found that calisthenics training is an "effective training solution to improve posture, strength and body composition without the use of any major training equipment".

History 

Catharine Esther Beecher (1800–1878) was an American educator and author who popularized and shaped a conservative ideological movement to both elevate and entrench women's place in the domestic sphere of American culture. She introduced calisthenics in a course of physical education and promoted it.

Disciples of Friedrich Ludwig Jahn brought their version of gymnastics to the United States, while Beecher and Dio Lewis set up physical education programs for women in the 19th century. Organized systems of calisthenics in America took a back seat to competitive sports after the Battle of the Systems, when the states mandated physical education systems. The Royal Canadian Air Force's calisthenics program published in the 1960s helped to launch modern fitness culture.

Calisthenics is associated with the rapidly growing international sport called street workout. The street workout consists of athletes performing calisthenics routines in timed sessions in front of a panel of judges. The World Street Workout & Calisthenics Federation (WSWCF) based in Riga, Latvia, orchestrates the annual national championships and hosts the world championships for all the national champions to compete at one competition. The World Calisthenics Organization (WCO) based in Los Angeles, California, promotes a series of competitions known globally as the Battle of the Bars. The WCO created the first-ever set of rules for formal competitions, including weight classes, timed round system, original judging criteria and a 10-point must system—giving an increasing number of athletes worldwide an opportunity to compete in these global competitions.

Street workout competitions have also popularised 'freestyle calisthenics', which is a style of calisthenics where the athlete uses their power and momentum to perform dynamic skills and tricks on the bar, often as part of a routine where each trick is linked together in a consistent flow. Freestyle calisthenics requires great skill to control one's momentum and understanding the mechanics of the body and the bar.

Calisthenics parks 

An increasing number of outdoor fitness training areas and outdoor gyms are being built around the world. Some are designed especially for calisthenics training and most are free to use by the public. Calisthenics parks have equipment like pull-up bars, monkey bars, parallel bars, and box jumps at one location. Freely accessible online maps exist that show the location and sample photos of calisthenics parks around the world.

See also 

 Alexander technique
 Ballistic training
 Bodyweight exercise
 Circuit training
 Complex training
 CrossFit
 Fitness trail
 Gymnastics
 Muscle-up
 Parkour
 Pilates
 Plyometrics
 Power training
 Pull-up (exercise)
 Sport
 Street workout
 Strength training
 Weight training

References

Bibliography

https://www.menshealth.com/fitness/a19530190/how-do-pistol-squat/
https://www.masterclass.com/articles/archer-push-up-guide
https://www.masterclass.com/articles/diamond-push-up-guide

Gymnastics
Physical exercise
Squatting position
Bodyweight exercises